As with most academic disciplines, there are a number of archaeological sub-disciplines typically characterised by a focus on a specific method or type of material, geographical or chronological focus, or other thematic concern.

By civilization
Certain civilizations have attracted so much attention that their study has been specifically named. These sub-disciplines include Assyriology (Mesopotamia), Indology ( India ), Classical archaeology (Greece and Rome),Etruscology (Etruria), Egyptology (Egypt), and Phoenician-Punic archeology (Phoenicia and its colonies), Sinology (China).

By historicity
Another main division of archaeology distinguishes:

 historical archaeology, which examines civilizations that left behind written records; and 
 prehistoric archaeology, which concerns itself with societies that did not have writing systems. However, the term is generally valid only in Europe and Asia where literate societies emerged without colonial influence. In areas where literacy arrived relatively late, it is more convenient to use other terms to divide up the archaeological record.

In areas of semi-literacy the term
protohistoric archaeology can be adopted to cover the study of societies with very limited written records. One example of a protohistoric site is Fort Ross on the northern California coast, which included settlements of literate Russians and non-literate American Indians and Alaska natives.
Ethnoarchaeology is the study of modern societies resembling extinct ones of archaeological interest, for archaeological purposes. It is often difficult to infer solid conclusions about the structure and values of ancient societies from their material remains, not only because objects are mute and say little about those who crafted and used them, but also because not all objects survive to be uncovered by scholars of a later age. Ethnoarchaeology seeks to determine, for instance, what kinds of objects used in a living settlement are deposited in middens or other places where they may be preserved, and how likely an object is to be discarded near to the place where it was used.
Taphonomy is the study of how objects decay and degrade over time. This information is critical to the interpretation of artefacts and other objects, so that the work of ancient people can be differentiated from the later work of living creatures and elemental forces.

By time period
A selective list of sub-disciplines distinguished by time-period or region of study might include:

African archaeology, Archaeology of the Americas, Australian archaeology, European archaeology: focuses on archaeologic study concerning the location of the findings. 
Industrial archaeology focuses on the preservation of material relics of the Industrial Revolution or the archaeology of work.
Near Eastern archaeology (sometimes known as Middle Eastern archaeology). See also Biblical archaeology, which applies the results of Near Eastern archaeology to the study of the Bible.
Medieval archaeology is the study of post-Roman European archaeology until the sixteenth century.
Post-medieval archaeology is the study of material culture in Europe from the 16th century onwards.
Modern archaeology is the study of modern society using archaeological methods, e.g. the Tucson Garbage Project.
Historical archaeology is the study of the past using both material evidence (i.e. artifacts and their contexts) and documentary evidence (including maps, photographs and film). Usually this is associated with the Americas.
Classical archaeology is the study of the past using both material evidence (i.e. artifacts and their contexts) and documentary evidence (including maps, literature of the time, other primary sources, etc.). Classical archaeology specifically pertains to the Mediterranean area and the archaeology of Greece and its surrounding areas.

Other sub-disciplines
The following is a list of other sub-disciplines. Some of these are not areas of study in their own right, and are only methods to be used in larger projects.

Aerial archaeology - studying sites from air photos, especially by identifying cropmarks
 Anthracology, the study of charcoal remains
Archaeoastronomy - the study of the relationship between the configuration of ancient monuments and astronomy
Archaeogeography - studies the dynamics of space over time
Archaeological science or Archaeometry - the application of scientific techniques or methodologies to archaeology such as radiocarbon dating, statistics and remote sensing
Archaeozoology - the study of animal remains in human settlements
Archaeobotany or paleoethnobotany - the study of human-plant interaction in the archaeological record
Battlefield archaeology - the study of conflict sites from an archeological perspective
Bioarchaeology
Calceology - the study of archaeological footwear
Computational archaeology - the application of computers, particularly GIS, to archaeology
Digital archaeology involves the application of information technologies and digital media to archaeological questions
Experimental archaeology involves attempting to re-enact past processes to test theories about ancient manufacturing, engineering and the effects of time on sites and objects (for example: flintknapping)
Environmental archaeology studies the long-term relationship between humans and their environments
Epigraphy
Forensic archaeology - the application of archaeological techniques to criminal investigations. It has become particularly prominent in the investigation of mass-killings associated with war crimes.
Geoarchaeology
Landscape archaeology involves identifying and studying sites as components in a wider geographical area
Osteoarchaeology
Numismatics - the political and economic study of coinage
Maritime archaeology - the study of submerged archaeological sites, including shipwrecks as well as settlements that have been engulfed by bodies of water
Museum studies - the display and interpretation of past remains for the public
Osteology - the scientific study of bones
Paleopathology - the study of ancient disease among animals and humans
Recceology - the study of warfare and the means of warfare from an archeological perspective
Settlement archaeology - "The study of the internal structure, arrangement, distribution, and relationships of ancient settlements in the context of their environmental setting and landscape position."
Philosophy of archaeology

Post-excavation analysis also makes use of a wide variety of further techniques.

See also
Art history
Historical anthropology

References

External links